Debs Consolidated School, also called District School No. 132, is a historic rural schoolhouse in Debs, Beltrami County, Minnesota United States. Classes were held in the building from 1916 to 1940. Its nomination to the National Register of Historic Places noted its unusual wooden Neoclassical façade.

See also
 National Register of Historic Places listings in Beltrami County, Minnesota

References

Buildings and structures in Beltrami County, Minnesota
National Register of Historic Places in Beltrami County, Minnesota
1914 establishments in Minnesota
School buildings completed in 1914
Neoclassical architecture in Minnesota